Iosif Viktorovich Solomonov (born 6 June 1986) is a former Russian professional footballer.

Club career
He made his Russian Football National League debut for FC Mashuk-KMV Pyatigorsk on 24 June 2008 in a game against FC Dynamo Bryansk. That was his only season in the FNL.

External links
 
 

1986 births
Living people
Russian footballers
Association football defenders
FC Anzhi Makhachkala players
Latvian Higher League players
Russian expatriate footballers
Expatriate footballers in Latvia
FC Mashuk-KMV Pyatigorsk players